Weman is a surname. Notable people with the surname include:

Adéle Weman (1844–1936), Finnish writer and educator
Gunnar Weman (born 1932), Swedish Lutheran archbishop

See also
Weyman